Karl Rost (active 1880–1919)  was a German entomologist and insect dealer.
From 1886 Rost was an insect dealer (Insekten-Händler) and professional insect collector in Berlin. He collected insects later offered for sale in Spain  and Greece (annually 1887-1898). In 1899 he went on an expedition to Siberia  and in 1900 -1901  collected in the  Caucasus. In 1903 he went to Japan to collect insects for the Swiss collector George Meyer-Darcis (He went to Japan again in 1911) after two years in  North-West India  (1906 for Meyer-Darcis and 1907 for his dealership). Rost described many new species from these regions.
Parts of his personal collection are in the Museum für Naturkunde in Berlin and other parts are in the Zoologisch Museum Amsterdam. The rest were privately sold, many to the dealership Staudinger -  Bang-Haas.

References
Walther Horn & Sigmund Schenkling: Index Litteraturae Entomologicae. Serie I: Die Welt-Literatur über die gesamte Entomologie bis inklusive 1863. Berlin 1928.

German entomologists
1919 deaths
Year of birth missing